Nierstein-Oppenheim is a former Verbandsgemeinde ("collective municipality") in the district Mainz-Bingen (Rheinhessen) in Rhineland-Palatinate, Germany. It is situated on the left bank of the Rhine, approx. 15 km south-east of Mainz. On 1 July 2014 it merged into the new Verbandsgemeinde Rhein-Selz.

The Verbandsgemeinde consisted of the following eleven Ortsgemeinden ("local municipalities"):

 Dalheim 
 Dexheim 
 Dienheim 
 Friesenheim 
 Hahnheim 
 Köngernheim 
 Mommenheim 
 Nierstein 
 Oppenheim
 Selzen 
 Undenheim

External links
 Official portal of Nierstein-Oppenheim

Former Verbandsgemeinden in Rhineland-Palatinate